The Last Broadcast may refer to:

 The Last Broadcast (album), a 2002 album by Doves
 The Last Broadcast (film), the 1998 cult horror film